Heliolonche pictipennis is a species of moth of the family Noctuidae. It is found in North America, including California and Arizona.

The wingspan is 16–17 mm.

The larvae feed on Malacothrix glabrata and Rafinesquia neomexicana.

External links
Images
Bug Guide

Heliothinae